Chorsu is a station of the Tashkent Metro on Oʻzbekiston Line. The station was opened on 6 November 1989 as part of the extension of the line between Alisher Navoiy and Chorsu Bazaar. On 30 April 1991 the line was extended to Beruniy.

The walls of the vestibule and the platform decorated with white Gazgan marble floor station is covered with gray granite.

The station is decorated with bas-reliefs of "Ecology" and Link of Times (painter Kim Yu).

References

Tashkent Metro stations
Railway stations opened in 1989